Juraj Fándly ( or György Fandl; 21 October 1750 – 7 March 1811) was a Slovak writer, Catholic priest and entomologist (bee-keeper) in the Kingdom of Hungary.

Life 
He was born in Častá (Cseszte), Kingdom of Hungary into a craftsman-farmer's family. His father died soon after his birth, and mother moved to the neighbouring village of Doľany (Ompitál), where he also visited elementary school.  He later studied at a Piarist gymnasium in Svätý Jur (Szentgyörgy), later studied theology in Buda (today part of Budapest) and Trnava (Nagyszombat). Due to his weak health he wasn't accepted into any religious order. In 1776 he was ordained and started working as a chaplain in Sereď (Szered) (1776), for a short time in Lukáčovce (Lakács) (1780), finally working as a priest in Naháč (Nahács) from 1780 to 1807. In the meantime he also worked as a secretary in the Slovenské učené tovarišstvo (Slovak Educated Brotherhood) (1792). Later, he retired to his home back in Doľany, where he lived until his death in 1811, and composed poetry.

Works 
 Dúverná zmlúva medzi mňíchom a ďáblom (1789) [An intimate treaty between the monk and the Devil] - the first major work in the Bernolák's Slovak language standard
 Piľní domajší a poľní hospodár (1792-1800) [Laborious house and field farmer]
 Zelinkár (1793) [Herbalist]
 Príhodné a svátečné kázňe (1795-1796) [Occasional and feat sermons]
 Compendiata historia gentis Slavae (1793) [A concise history of the Slovak nation]
 O úhoroch a i včelách rozmlúváňí (1801) [A discussion about fallows and also about bees]
 Slovenskí včelár (1802) [The Diligent House]

Works online 
 Anti-Fándly aneb Dúverné Zmlúwánj mezi Theodulusem, tretího Franciskánúw rádu bosákem, a Gurem Fándly, ... W Halle: [s.n.], 1789. 62 p. - available at ULB's Digital Library
 FÁNDLY, J., BAJZA, J. I., BERNOLÁK, A. Ešče Ňečo o Epigrammatéch, anebožto Málorádkoch M. W. P. Gozefa Bagza nowotného slowenského Epi Grammatistu ... [Pole Eliziské]: [s.n.], [1791]. 15 p. - available at ULB's Digital Library

External links 
 Juraj Fándly 

Slovak writers
18th-century Hungarian male writers
19th-century Hungarian male writers
People from Pezinok District
1750 births
1811 deaths
Slovak Roman Catholic priests
Slovak entomologists
Hungarian-language writers